Uganda Telecom, whose full legal name is Uganda Telecom Limited (UTL), is an information and communication technology network company in Uganda owned by the government of Uganda and currently under receivership due to large debts of about USh 700 billion (approx. US$200 million) and mismanagement. UTL was put under receivership after the Libyan company that owned about 69 percent shares left in 2017 .

History
Following the Ugandan Parliament's passage of the Communications Act in 1997, the Ugandan parastatal Uganda Posts and Telecommunications Company Limited (UPTCL) was divided into four entities:

 Uganda Communications Commission - the communications industry regulator
 Uganda Post Limited - also known as Posta Uganda
 PostBank Uganda - a government-owned financial institution
 Uganda Telecom - an information technology and communication network company

In June 2000, UTL was privatized when the government divested 51 percent of its shares to Ucom, a consortium formed by Detecon of Germany, Telecel International of Switzerland, and Orascom Telecom Holding of Egypt. The Ugandan government retained 49 percent ownership in UTL.

Scope of service
UTL is a leading total communications provider with a broad range of services in Uganda, including:

 Fixed voice (copper, CDMA, fixed GSM)
 Mobile voice and data
 Dedicated circuits for data and internet (xDSL, FTTx, leased lines)
 Broadband services (3G, WiMAX, xDSL, FTTx, CDMA, Wi-Fi)
 Data centre services (hosting/housing/backup/failover)

In February 2009, UTL launched an unstructured supplementary service data-based mobile wallet service called "M-SENTE", using software purchased from Redknee Solutions Inc., a Canadian information technology company. In September 2009, UTL became the first Ugandan provider to introduce the solar powered hand-held mobile phone, locally called "Kasana". In July 2011, UTL estimated their own market share of the Ugandan telecommunication industry at about 10 percent.

Seizure and release of assets
In March 2011, the Ugandan government seized Lap Green's 69 percent shareholding in UTL as part of sanctions against the regime of Muammar Gaddafi. After the end of the Libyan civil war in May 2012, the shareholding was returned to Lap Green, ending a period of considerable uncertainty for the carrier. Since then, UTL has undergone a major restructuring to revive its fortunes.

Ownership
As of October 2018, UTL was a joint venture between Taleology Holdings GIB Limited, a private company based in Nigeria, which owned 67 percent of the company, and the Ugandan government, which owned the remaining 33 percent.

Leadership structure
Stephen Kaboyo has been the chairman of the board of directors since early 2014. The managing director is Mark Shoebridge, who was appointed temporarily on 21 May 2015 as he was leaving the company from his role as chief fixed services officer to lead operations in Vodacom Nigeria. He was re-appointed effective 8 February 2016 upon his return to Uganda to drive the turnaround of the struggling operator. The chief finance officer is James Wilde, replacing John Sendikaddiwa who resigned suddenly in October 2016. The chief legal counsel is David Nambale. The acting chief commercial officer is Ameer Kamal Arif. The chief human resources & administration officer is Emmanuel Jones Kasule, who also joined the team in 2016.

Parliamentary investigation 
In November 2016, the parliament of Uganda set up a select committee to investigate alleged mismanagement at Uganda Telecom, including the allegation that UGX:1.5 billion is missing from petty cash through theft from long term staff in the finance department over a period of many years. Many of the finance department staff involved have been dismissed, been terminated, or have resigned since this fraud was uncovered in 2016 through audits conducted by the new management. The committee's report was expected within two months.

Insolvency and Receivership
In February 2017, UCom, the government of Libya-owned subsidiary unilaterally pulled out of the struggling company, forcing the Uganda government to assume total sole control. In April the same year, the Uganda government placed the telco under receivership.

In December 2017, Uganda announced plans to sell a majority stake in the troubled company. Nearly a dozen investors from Europe, China, South Africa and the USA expressed interest in acquiring a stake in UTL.

In July 2018, The EastAfrican reported that of the investors who submitted purchase bids, Mauritius Telecom emerged as the only capable, credible, legitimate bidder, with a bid of $45 million upfront, and another $100 million over the next 36 months, for a 69-31 majority shareholding. Discussions are ongoing to close the acquisition. The Uganda Financial Intelligence Authority (FIA), has successfully vetted the potential investor.

In a cabinet meeting convened on Monday 1 October 2018 and chaired by President Yoweri Museveni, Taleology Holdings GIB Limited of Nigeria, was selected to operate UTL for the next 20 years. The deal includes UTL's total assets, valued at USh148 billion (US$39.5 million), tax waivers, an extended frequency and Uganda's national backbone optic fibre infrastructure. In  exchange, Taleology will make a non refundable US$7.1 million (USh27 billion), at signature of the paperwork and another US$63.9 million (USh240 billion) no later than 60 days from that date, otherwise they forfeit the concession. When, in February 2019, Taleology failed to remit the required funding to effect the acquisition, the company went back on the market and a new buyer is being sought.

On 2 January 2020, Justice Lydia Mugambe of the Civil Division of the High Court of Uganda, appointed Ruth Sebatindira as the Administrator of Uganda Telecom Limited, under a court-appointed receivership since April 2017. Sebatindira took over the administration of UTL from Bemanya Twebaze on 6 January 2020.

See also
 MTN Group
 Bharti Airtel
 List of mobile network operators in Uganda

References

External links
 Company Homepage
 UTL's Innovative Edge
 Study of the Acquisition of UTL by LAP Greencom
 LAP Greencom's African Telecommunication Network
  UTL gets new MD

Mobile phone companies of Uganda
Telecommunications companies of Uganda
Companies based in Kampala
Telecommunications companies established in 2000
2000 establishments in Uganda